This is a historical list dealing with women scientists in the 20th century. During this time period, women working in scientific fields were rare. Women at this time faced barriers in higher education and often denied access to scientific institutions; in the Western world, the first-wave feminist movement began to break down many of these barriers.

Anthropology

 Heloísa Alberto Torres (1895 – 1977),  Brazilian anthropologist and museum director
 Katharine Bartlett (1907–2001), American physical anthropologist, museum curator
 Ruth Benedict (1887–1948), American anthropologist
 Anna Bērzkalne (1891–1956), Latvian folklorist and ethnographer
 Alicia Dussán de Reichel (born 1920), Colombian anthropologist
 Dina Dahbany-Miraglia (born 1938), American Yemini linguistic anthropologist, educator
Bertha P. Dutton (1903–1994), anthropologist and ethnologist
Phebe Fjellström (1924–2007), Swedish ethnologist
Helen Groger-Wurm (1921–2005), Austrian-born Australian ethnologist
Zora Neale Hurston (1891–1960), American folklorist and anthropologist
 Nadine Ivanitzky (1874-1919) Ukrainian (Soviet) sociologist and cultural anthropologist
 Marjorie F. Lambert (1908–2006), American archeologist and anthropologist who studied Southwestern Puebloan peoples
 Dorothea Leighton (1908–1989), American social psychiatrist, founded the field of medical anthropology
 Katharine Luomala (1907–1992), American anthropologist
 Margaret McArthur (1919–2002), Australian anthropologist, nutritionist and educator
 Margaret Mead (1901–1978), American anthropologist
 Grete Mostny (1914–1991), Austrian-born Chilean anthropologist and archaeologist
 Miriam Tildesley (1883–1979), British anthropologist
 Mildred Trotter (1899–1991), American forensic anthropologist
 Camilla Wedgwood (1901–1955), British/Australian anthropologist
 Alba Zaluar (1942–2019), Brazilian anthropologist specializing in urban anthropology

Archaeology

 Sonia Alconini (born 1965), Bolivian archaeologist of the Formative Period of the Lake Titicaca basin
 Niède Guidon (Born 1933), Brazilian archaeologist   
 Birgit Arrhenius (born 1932), Swedish archaeologist 
 Dorothea Bate (1878–1951), British archaeologist and pioneer of archaeozoology
 Alex Bayliss British archaeologist   
 Crystal Bennett (1918–1987), British archaeologist whose research focused on Jordan
 Zeineb Benzina Tunisian archeologist
 Jole Bovio Marconi (1897–1986), Italian archaeologist and prehistorian
 Juliet Clutton-Brock (1933–2015), British zooarchaeologist who specialized in domestic animals   
 Dorothy Charlesworth (1927–1981), British archaeologist and expert on Roman glass
 Lily Chitty (1893–1979), British archaeologist who specialized in the prehistoric history of Wales and the west of England
 Mary Kitson Clark (1905–2005), British archaeologist best known for her work on the Roman-British in Northern England
 Bryony Coles (born 1946), British prehistoric archaeologist
 Alana Cordy-Collins (1944–2015), American archaeologist specializing in Peruvian prehistory
 Rosemary Cramp (born 1929), British archaeologist whose research focuses on Anglo-Saxons in Britain
 Joan Breton Connelly American classical archaeologist
 Margaret Conkey (born 1943), American archaeologist
 Hester A. Davis (1930–2014), American archaeologist who was instrumental in establishing public policy and ethical standards
 Frederica de Laguna (1906–2004), American archaeologist best known for her work on the archaeology of the Pacific Northwest and Alaska
 Kelly Dixon, American archaeologist specializing in the American West
 Janette Deacon (born 1939), South African archaeologist specializing in rock art conservation
 Elizabeth Eames (1918–2008), British archaeologist who was an expert on medieval tiles
 Anabel Ford (born 1951), American archaeologist 
 Aileen Fox (1907–2005), British archaeologist known excavating prehistoric and Roman sites throughout the United Kingdom
 Alison Frantz (1903–1995), American archaeological photographer and Byzantine scholar
 Honor Frost (1917–2010), Turkish archaeologist who specialized in underwater archaeology
 Perla Fuscaldo (born 1941), Argentine egyptologist
 Elizabeth Baldwin Garland, American archaeologist
 Kathleen K. Gilmore (1914–2010), American archaeologist known for her research in Spanish colonial archaeology
 Dorothy Garrod (1892–1968), British archaeologist who specialized in the Palaeolithic period
 Roberta Gilchrist (born 1965), Canadian archaeologist specializing in medieval Britain
 Marija Gimbutas (1921–1994), Lithuanian archaeologist (Kurgan hypothesis)
 Hetty Goldman (1881–1972), American archaeologist and one of the first female archaeologists to conduct excavations in the Middle East and Greece
 Audrey Henshall (born 1927), British archaeologist and prehistorian
 Corinne Hofman (born 1959), Dutch archaeologist 
 Cynthia Irwin-Williams (1936–1990), American archaeologist of the prehistoric Southwest
Wilhelmina Feemster Jashemski (1910–2007), American archaeologist who specialized in the ancient site of Pompei
 Margaret Ursula Jones (1916–2001), British archaeologist best known for directing Britain's largest archaeological excavation at Mucking, Essex
 Rosemary Joyce (born 1956), American archaeologist who uncovered chocolate's archaeological record and studies Honduran pre-history
 Kathleen Kenyon (1906–1978), British archaeologist known for her research on the Neolothic culture in Egypt and Mesopotamia
 Alice Kober (1906–1950), American classical archaeologist best known for her research that led to the deciphering of Linear B
 Kristina Killgrove (born 1977), American bioarchaeologist
 Winifred Lamb (1894–1963), British archaeologist
 Mary Leakey (1913–1996), British archaeologist known for discovering Proconsul remains which are now believed to be human's ancestor
 Li Liu (archaeologist) (born 1953), Chinese-American archaeologist specializing in Neolithic and Bronze Age China
 Anna Marguerite McCann (1933–2017), American archaeologist known for her work in underwater archaeology
 Isabel McBryde (born 1934), Australian archaeologist 
 Betty Meehan (born 1933), Australian anthropologist and archaeologist
 Audrey Meaney (born 1931), British archaeologist and expert on Anglo-Saxon England
 Margaret Murray (1863–1963), British-Indian Egyptologist and the first woman to be appointed a lecturer in archaeology in the United Kingdom
 Bertha Parker Pallan (1907–1978), American archaeologist known for being the first female Native American archaeologist
 Tatiana Proskouriakoff (1909–1985), Russian-American archaeologist who contributed significantly to deciphering the Maya hieroglyphs
 Charlotte Roberts (born 1957), British bioarchaeologist 
 Margaret Rule (1928–2015), British archaeologist led the excavation of the Tudor Warship Mary Rose'
 Elisabeth Ruttkay (1926–2009), Austrian Neolithic and Bronze Age specialist
 Hanna Rydh (1891–1964), Swedish archaeologist and prehistorian
 Elizabeth Slater (1946–2014), British archaeologist who specialized in archaeometallurgy
 Julie K. Stein, Researches prehistoric humans in the Pacific Northwest
 Hoang Thi Than (born 1944), Vietnamese geological engineer and archaeologist
 Birgitta Wallace (born 1944), Swedish–Canadian archaeologist whose research focuses on Norse migration to North America
 Zheng Zhenxiang (born 1929), Chinese archaeologist and Bronze Age specialist

Astronomy
 Claudia Alexander (1959–2015), American planetary scientist
 Beatriz Barbuy (Born 1950) Brazilian astrophysicist
 Mary Adela Blagg (1858–1944), British astronomer
 Mary Brück (1925–2008), Irish astronomer, astrophysicist, science historian
 Margaret Burbidge (1919–2020), British astrophysicist
 Jocelyn Bell Burnell (born 1943), Northern Irish-British astrophysicist 
 Annie Jump Cannon (1863–1941), American astronomer
 Janine Connes, French astronomer
 A. Grace Cook (1887–1958), British astronomer
 Heather Couper (1949–2020), British astronomer (astronomy popularisation, science education)
 Joy Crisp, American planetary scientist
 Nancy Crooker (born 1944), American space physicist
 Sandra Faber (born 1944), American astronomer
 Joan Feynman (1927–2020), American space physicist 
 Pamela Gay (born 1973), American astronomer
 Vera Fedorovna Gaze (1899–1954), Russian astronomer (planet 2388 Gase and Gaze Crater on Venus are named for her)
 Julie Vinter Hansen (1890–1960), Danish astronomer
 Martha Haynes (born 1951), American astronomer
 Lisa Kaltenegger, Austrian/American astronomer
 Dorothea Klumpke (1861–1942), American-born astronomer
 Henrietta Leavitt (1868–1921), American astronomer (periodicity of variable stars)
 Evelyn Leland (c.1870–c.1930), American astronomer working at the Harvard College Observatory
 Priyamvada Natarajan, Indian/American astrophysicist
 Carolyn Porco (born 1953), American planetary scientist
 Cecilia Payne-Gaposchkin (1900–1978), British-American astronomer
 Ruby Payne-Scott (1912–1981), Australian radio astronomer
 Vera Rubin (1928–2016), American astronomer
 Charlotte Moore Sitterly (1898–1990), American astronomer
 Jill Tarter (born 1944), American astronomer
 Beatrice Tinsley (1941–1981), New Zealand astronomer and cosmologist

Biology

 Johanna Döbereiner (born 1924), Brazilian pioneer in soil biology
 Wilhelmine Key (1872-1955), American geneticist
 Effa Muhse (1877-1968), American biologist
 Nora Lilian Alcock (1874–1972), British plant pathologist
 Alice Alldredge (born 1949), American oceanographer and researcher of marine snow, discover of Transparent Exopolymer Particles (TEP) and demersal hellon
 June Almeida (1930–2007), British virologist
 E. K. Janaki Ammal (1897–1984), Indian botanist
 Lena Clemmons Artz (1891–1976), American botanist
 Vandika Ervandovna Avetisyan (born 1928), Armenian botanist and mycologist
 Denise P. Barlow (1950–2017), British geneticist
 Yvonne Barr (1932–2016), British virologist (co-discovery of Epstein-Barr virus)
 Lela Viola Barton (1901–1967), American botanist
 Kathleen Basford (1916–1998), British botanist
 Gillian Bates (born 1956), British geneticist (Huntington's disease)
 Val Beral (born 1946), British–Australian epidemiologist
 Grace Berlin (1897–1982), American ecologist, ornithologist and historian
 Agathe L. van Beverwijk (1907–1963), Dutch mycologist
 Gladys Black (1909–1998), American ornithologist
 Idelisa Bonnelly (born 1931), Dominican Republic marine biologist
 Alice Middleton Boring (1883–1955), American biologist
 Annette Frances Braun (1911–1968), American entomologist, expert on microlepidoptera
 Victoria Braithwaite (1967–2019), British biologist and ichthyologist. 
 Linda B. Buck (born 1947), American neuroscientist (Nobel prize in Physiology or Medicine 2004 for olfactory receptors)
 Hildred Mary Butler (1906–1975), Australian microbiologist
 Esther Byrnes (1867–1946), American biologist and science teacher
 Bertha Cady (1873–1956), American entomologist and educator
 Audrey Cahn (1905–2008), Australian microbiologist and nutritionist
 Eleanor Carothers (1882–1957), American zoologist, geneticist and cytologist
 Rachel Carson (1907–1964), American marine biologist and conservationist
 Edith Katherine Cash (1890–1992), American mycologist and lichenologist
 Ann Chapman (1937–2009), New Zealand biologist and limnologist
 Martha Chase (1927–2003), American molecular biologist
 Mary-Dell Chilton (born 1939), American molecular biologist
 Augusta Christie-Linde (1870–1953), Swedish zoologist
 Theresa Clay (1911–1995), English entomologist
 Edith Clements (1874–1971), American botanist and pioneer of botanical ecology
 Elzada Clover (1897–1980), American botanist
 Gerty Theresa Cori (1896–1957), American biochemist (Nobel Prize in Physiology or Medicine in 1947)
 Suzanne Cory (born 1942), Australian immunologist/cancer researcher
 Ursula M. Cowgill (1927–2015), American biologist and anthropologist
 Ellinor Catherine Cunningham van Someren (1915–1988), British medical entomologist
 Janet Darbyshire, British epidemiologist
 Gertrude Crotty Davenport (1866–1946), American zoologist and eugenicist
 Nina Demme (1902–1977), Russian arctic explorer and ornithologist
 Sophie Charlotte Ducker (1909–2004), Australian botanist
 Sylvia Earle (born 1935), American marine biologist, oceanographer and explorer
 Sophia Eckerson (1880–1954), American botanist
 Sylvia Edlund (1945–2014), Canadian botanist 
 Charlotte Elliott (1883–1974), American plant physiologist
 Alice Catherine Evans (1881-1975), American microbiologist
 Vera Danchakoff (1879 – about 1950), Russian anatomist, cell biologist and embryologist, "mother of stem cells"
 Rhoda Erdmann (1870–1935), German cell biologist
 Katherine Esau (1898–1997), German-American botanist
 Edna H. Fawcett (1879–1960), American botanist
 Catherine Feuillet (born 1965), French molecular biologist who was the first scientist to map the wheat chromosome 3B
 Victoria Foe (born 1945), American developmental biologist, and research professor at the University of Washington's Center for Cell Dynamics
 Dian Fossey (1932–1985), American zoologist
 Faith Fyles (1875–1961), Canada's first botanical artist
 Birutė Galdikas (born 1946), German primatologist and conservationist
 Margaret Sylvia Gilliland (1917–1990), Australian biochemist
 Jane Goodall (born 1934), British biologist, primatologist
 Isabella Gordon (1901–1988), Scottish marine biologist
 Susan Greenfield (born 1950), British neurophysiologist (neurophysiology of the brain, popularisation of science)
 Charlotte Elliott (1883–1974), American plant physiologist
 Constance Endicott Hartt (1900–1984), American botanist
 Eliza Amy Hodgson (1888–1983), New Zealand botanist
 Lena B. Smithers Hughes (1905–1987), American botanist, developed strains of the Valencia orange
 Maria Isabel Hylton Scott (1889–1990), Argentine zoologist and malacologist
 Eva Jablonka (born 1952), Polish/Israeli biologist and philosopher
 AnnMari Jansson (1934–2007), Swedish systems ecologist
 Adele Juda (1888–1949), Austrian neurologist
 Marian Koshland (1921–1997), American immunologist
 Frances Adams Le Sueur (1919–1995), British botanist and ornithologist
 Margaret Reed Lewis (1881–1970), American cell biologist and embryologist 
 Maria Carmelo Lico (1927–1985), Italo-Argentinian-Brazilian neuroscientist
 Gloria Lim (born 1930), Singaporean mycologist, first woman Dean of the Faculty of Science, University of Singapore
 Liliana Lubinska (1904–1990), Polish neuroscientist
 Marguerite Lwoff (1905–1979), French microbiologist and virologist
 Misha Mahowald (1963–1996), American neuroscientist
 Irene Manton (1904–1988), British botanist, cytologist 
 Lynn Margulis (1938–2011), American biologist
 Deborah Martin-Downs, Canadian aquatic biologist, ecologist
 Bettie Sue Masters (born 1937), American biochemist
 Sara Branham Matthews (1888–1962), American microbiologist
 Mary MacArthur, Canadian food scientist, dehydration and freezing of fresh foods
 Barbara McClintock (1902–1992), American geneticist, Nobel prize for Physiology or Medicine 1983
 Eileen McCracken (1920–1988), Irish botanist 
 Ruth Colvin Starrett McGuire (1893–1950), American plant pathologist
 Anne McLaren (1927–2007), British developmental biologist
 Ethel Irene McLennan (1891–1983), Australian botanist
 Eunice Thomas Miner (1899–1993), American biologist, executive director of the New York Academy of Sciences 1939–1967
 Rita Levi-Montalcini (1909–2012), Italian neurologist (Nobel prize for Physiology or Medicine 1986 for growth factors)
 Marianne V. Moore (graduated 1975), aquatic ecologist
 Ann Haven Morgan (1882–1966), American zoologist
 Ann Nardulli (1948–2018), American endocrinologist
 Margaret Newton (1887–1971), Canadian plant phytopathologist and mycologist (pioneer in stem rust research)
 Christiane Nüsslein-Volhard (born 1942), German geneticist and developmental biologist (Nobel prize for Physiology or Medicine 1995 forhomeobox genes)
 Ida Shepard Oldroyd (1856–1940), American conchologist
 Daphne Osborne (1930–2006), British plant physiologist (plant hormones)
 Janina Oyrzanowska-Poplewska (1918–2001), Polish veterinarian and epizootiologist
 Mary Parke (1908–1989), British marine botanist specialising in phycology, the study of algae
 Jane E. Parker (born 1960), British botanist who researches the immune responses of plants
 Ruth Myrtle Patrick (1907–2013), American botanist, limnologist, and pollution expert
 Eva J. Pell (born 1948), American plant pathologist
 Theodora Lisle Prankerd (1878–1939), British botanist
 Isabella Preston (1881–1965), Canadian ornamental plant breeder (botanist)
 Joan Beauchamp Procter (1897–1931), British zoologist (herpetologist)
 Ragna Rask-Nielsen (1900–1998), Danish biochemist
 Julie Hanta Razafimanahaka, Madagascar biologist, conservationist
 F. Gwendolen Rees (1906–1994), British parasitologist
 Jytte Reichstein Nilsson (1932–2020), Danish protozoologist
 Evdokia Reshetnik (1903-1996), Ukrainian zoologist and discoverer of Ukraine's sandy blind mole-rat 
 Anita Roberts (1942–2006), American molecular biologist, "mother of TGF-Beta"
 Edith A. Roberts (1881–1977), American botanist and plant ecology pioneer
 Gudrun Ruud (1882–1958), Norwegian zoologist specializing in embryology
 Hazel Schmoll (1890–1990), American botanist
 Eva Schönbeck-Temesy (1930–2011), Austrian botanist of Hungarian descent
 Idah Sithole-Niang (born 1957), biochemist focusing on cowpea production and disease
 Florence Wells Slater (1864–1941), American entomologist
 Margaret A. Stanley, British virologist and epithelial biologist
 Phyllis Starkey (born 1947), British biochemist and medical researcher
 Magda Staudinger (1902–1997), Latvian-German biologist and chemist
 Sarah Stewart (1905–1976), Mexican American microbiologist (discovered the Polyomavirus)
 Ragnhild Sundby (1922–2006), Norwegian zoologist
 Felicitas Svejda (1920–2016), Canadian botanist (rose breeder)
 Maria Telkes (1900–1995), Hungarian-American biophysicist
 Lois H. Tiffany (1924–2009), American mycologist
 Amelia Tonon (1899–1961), Italian entomologist
 Lydia Villa-Komaroff (born 1947), Mexican American molecular cellular biologist
 Karen Vousden (born 1957), British cancer researcher
 Elisabeth Vrba (born 1942), South African paleontologist
 Marvalee Wake (born 1939), American biologist researching limbless amphibians, educator
 Erna Walter (1893–1992), German botanist
 Jane C. Wright (1919–2013), American oncologist
 Kono Yasui (1880–1971), Japanese cytologist
 Eleanor Anne Young (1925–2007), American nutritionist and educator
 Mary Sophie Young (1872–1919), American botanist

Chemistry

 Pauline Ramart (1880–1953), French chemist and politician
 Maria Abbracchio (born 1956), Italian pharmacologist who works with purinergic receptors and identified GPR17. On Reuter's most-cited list since 2006.
 Marian Ewurama Addy (1942–2014), Ghanaian biochemist, specializing in herbal medicine; first woman in Ghana to attain the rank of full professor in the natural sciences; winner of the UNESCO Kalinga Prize in 1999
 Barbara Askins (born 1939), American chemist
 Karin Aurivillius (1920–1982), Swedish chemist and crystallographer
 Alice Ball (1892–1916), American chemist
 Ulrike Beisiegel (born 1952), German biochemist, researcher of liver fats and first female president of the University of Göttingen 
 Anne Beloff-Chain (1921–1991), British biochemist
 Jeannette Brown (born 1934), medicinal chemist, writer, educator
 Astrid Cleve (1875–1968), Swedish chemist
 Seetha Coleman-Kammula (born 1950), Indian chemist and plastics designer, turned environmentalist
 Maria Skłodowska-Curie (1867–1934), Polish-French chemist (pioneer in radiology, discovery of polonium and radium), Nobel prize in physics 1903 and Nobel prize in chemistry 1911
 Madeleine M. Joullié (born 1927), Brazilian organic chemist
 Mary Campbell Dawbarn (1902–1982), Australian biochemist
 Moira Lenore Dynon (1920–1976), Australian chemist
 Gertrude B. Elion (1918–1999), American biochemist (Nobel prize in Physiology or Medicine 1988 for drug development)
 Claire E. Eyers (fl. 2004), British mass spectrometist
Nellie Ivy Fisher (1907–1995), London-born industrial chemist, first woman to lead a division of Kodak in Australia
 Gwendolyn Wilson Fowler (1907–1997), American chemist and first licensed African American pharmacist in Iowa
 Rosalind Franklin (1920–1957), British physical chemist and crystallographer
 Ellen Gleditsch (1879–1968), Norwegian radiochemist
 Jenny Glusker (born 1931), British biochemist, educator
 Emīlija Gudriniece (1920–2004), Latvian chemist and academic
 Frances Mary Hamer (1894–1980), British chemist who specialized in photographic sensitization compounds
 Anna J. Harrison (1912–1998), American organic chemist
 Dorothy Crowfoot Hodgkin (1910–1994), British crystallographer, Nobel prize in chemistry 1964
 Clara Immerwahr (1870–1915), German chemist
 Allene Jeanes (1906–1995), American chemical researcher who developed Dextran and Xanthan gum
 Irène Joliot-Curie (1897–1956), French chemist and nuclear physicist, Nobel Prize in Chemistry 1935
 Chika Kuroda (1884–1968), Japanese chemist
 Stephanie Kwolek (1923–2014), American chemist, inventor of Kevlar
 Lidija Liepiņa (1891–1985), Latvian chemist, one of the first Soviet doctorates in chemistry
 Kathleen Lonsdale (1903–1971), British crystallographer
 Bodil Jerslev Lund (1919–2005), Danish chemist and pharmacist
 Grace Medes (1886–1967), American biochemist
 Maud Menten (1879–1960), Canadian biochemist
 Christina Miller (1899–2001), Scottish chemist, one of the first women elected to Royal Society of Edinburgh
 Catherine J. Murphy (born 1964), American chemist
 Muriel Wheldale Onslow (1880–1932), British biochemist
 Helen T. Parsons (1886–1977), American biochemist
 Nellie M. Payne (1900–1990), American entomologist and agricultural chemist
 Eva Philbin (1914–2005), Irish chemist 
 Darshan Ranganathan (1941–2001), Indian organic chemist
 Mildred Rebstock (1919–2011), American pharmaceutical chemist
 Elizabeth Rona (1890–1981), Hungarian (naturalized American), nuclear chemist and polonium expert
 Patsy Sherman (1930–2008), American chemist, co-inventor of Scotchgard
 Marija Šimanska (1922–1995), Latvian chemist
 Taneko Suzuki (1926–2020), Japanese biochemist who created Marinbeef, a product made of fish that tasted like beef
 Ida Noddack Tacke (1896–1978), German chemist and physicist
 Grace Oladunni Taylor (born 1937), Nigerian chemist 2nd woman inducted into the Nigerian Academy of Science
 Jean Thomas (born 1942), British biochemist (chromatin)
 Michiyo Tsujimura (1888–1969), Japanese biochemist, agricultural scientist
 Joanna Maria Vandenberg (born 1938), Dutch solid state chemist and crystallographer
 Elizabeth Williamson, English pharmacologist and herbalist
 Ada Yonath (born 1939), Israeli crystallographer, Nobel prize in Chemistry 2009
 Daisy Yen Wu (1902–1993), first Chinese woman to work as a biochemist

Geology

 Mária Mottl (1906 – 1980), Hungarian speleologist and vertebrate paleontologist
 Mathilde Dolgopol de Sáez (1901 – 1957), Argentinian vertebrate paleontologist
 Rosaly Lopes (born 1957), Brazilian is a planetary geologist,volcanologist
 Zonia Baber (1862–1955), American geographer and geologist
 Tove Birkelund (1928=1986), Danish historical geologist
 Karen Callisen (1882–1970), Danish geologist
 Inés Cifuentes (1954–2014), American seismologist and educator
 Moira Dunbar (1918–1999), Scottish-Canadian glaciologist
 Elizabeth F. Fisher (1872–1941), American geologist
 Regina Fleszarowa (1888–1969), Polish geologist
 Frances Gamble (1942-1997), South African speleologist and climatologist
 Winifred Goldring (1888–1971), American paleontologist
 Eileen Hendriks (1887–1978), British geologist
 Rosemary Hutton (1925-2004, Scottish geophysicist and pioneer of magnetotellurics
 Edith Kristan-Tollmann (1934–1995), Austrian geologist and paleontologist
 Dorothée Le Maître (1896–1990), French paleontologist
 Karen Cook McNally (1940–2014), American seismologist
 Inge Lehmann (1888–1993), Danish seismologist who discovered Earth's solid inner core
 Marcia McNutt (born 1951), American geophysicist
 Ellen Louise Mertz (1896–1987), Danish engineering geologist
 Ruth Schmidt (1916–2014), American geologist
 Ethel Shakespear (1871–1946), English geologist
 Kathleen Sherrard (1898–1975), Australian geologist and palaeontologist
 Ethel Skeat (1865–1939), English paleontologist and geologist
 Marjorie Sweeting (1920–1994), British geomorphologist
 Marie Tharp (1920–2006), American geologist and oceanographic cartographer
Elsa G. Vilmundardóttir (1932–2008), Iceland's first female geologist
 Marguerite Williams (1895–1991), American geologist
 Alice Wilson (1881–1964), Canadian geologist and paleontologist
 Elizabeth A. Wood (1912–2006), American crystallographer and geologist

Mathematics or computer science

Hertha Marks Ayrton (1854–1923), British mathematician and electrical engineer (electric arcs, sand ripples, invention of several devices, geometry)
Cecilia Berdichevsky (1925–2010), pioneering Argentinian computer scientist
Anita Borg (1949–2003), American computer scientist, founder of the Institute for Women and Technology
 Carolina Araujo, Brazilian mathematician
Mary L. Cartwright (1900–1998), British mathematician
Amanda Chessell, British computer scientist
Ingrid Daubechies (born 1954), Belgian mathematician (Wavelets – first woman to receive the National Academy of Sciences Award in Mathematics)
Tatjana Ehrenfest-Afanassjewa (1876–1964), Russian/Dutch mathematician
Deborah Estrin (born 1959), American computer scientist
Vera Faddeeva (1906–1983), Russian mathematician. One of the first to publish works on linear algebra.
Shafi Goldwasser (born 1959), American-Israel computer scientist
Evelyn Boyd Granville (born 1924), American mathematician, second African-American woman to get a PhD in mathematics
Marion Cameron Gray (1902–1979), Scottish mathematician
Barbara Grosz (born 1948), American computer scientist; 1993 President of the AAAI
Milly Koss (1928–2012), American computing pioneer
Bryna Kra (born 1966), American mathematician
Margaret Hamilton (born 1936), American computer scientist, systems engineer, and business owner
Frances Hardcastle (1866–1941), mathematician, founding member of the American Mathematical Society
Julia Hirschberg, American computer scientist and computational linguist
Betty Holberton (1927–2001), American computer programmer
Grace Hopper (1906–1992), American computer scientist
Margarete Kahn (1880–1942), German mathematician
Lyudmila Keldysh (1904–1976), Russia mathematician known for set theory and geometric topology
Marta Kwiatkowska (born 1957), Polish-British Computer scientist
Marguerite Lehr (1898–1987), American mathematician
Margaret Anne LeMone (born 1946), mathematician and atmospheric scientist
Barbara Liskov (born 1939), American computer scientist for whom the Liskov substitution principle is named
Margaret Millington (1944–1973), English mathematician
Mangala Narlikar (graduated 1962), Indian mathematician
Klara Dan von Neumann (1911–1963), Hungarian computer scientist
Frances Northcutt (born 1943), American engineer
Rózsa Péter (1905–1977), Hungarian mathematician
Cicely Popplewell (1920–1995), British software engineer, 1960s
Karen Sparck Jones (1935–2007), British computer scientist
Dorothy Vaughan (1910–2008), American mathematician, worked at NACA's Langley Memorial Aeronautical Laboratory
Dorothy Maud Wrinch (1894–1976), British mathematician and theoretical biochemist
Jeannette Wing (born 1956), computer scientist, Microsoft Corporate Vice President
Maryam Mirzakhani (1977–2017), Iranian mathematician, first female recipient of the Fields medal
Karen Uhlenbeck (born 1942), American mathematician and founder of modern geometric analysis

Science education
 Kathleen Jannette Anderson (1927–2002), Scottish biologist
 Susan Blackmore (born 1951), British science writer (memetics, evolutionary theory, consciousness, parapsychology)
 Florence Annie Yeldham (1877–1945), British school teacher and historian of arithmetic

Engineering
 Zhenan Bao (born 1970), American chemical engineer and materials scientist
 Frances Bradfield (1896–1967), British aeronautical engineer
 Isabel Escobar, Brazilian Engineering 
 Jayne Bryant, engineering director for BAE Systems
 Nance Dicciani (born 1947), American chemical engineer
 Ana María Flores (born 1952), Bolivian engineer
 Kate Gleason (1865–1933), American engineer
 Ida Holz (born 1935), Uruguayan engineer
 Frances Hugle (1927–1968), American engineer
 Marianne Kärrholm (1921–2018), Swedish chemical engineer
 Julia King, Baroness Brown of Cambridge (born 1954), British engineer
 Elsie MacGill (1907–1980), First Canadian female engineer
 Florence Violet McKenzie (1890 or 1892–1982), first female electrical engineer in Australia
 Concepción Mendizábal Mendoza (1893–1985), first female civil engineer in Mexico
 Maria Tereza Jorge Pádua (born 1943), Brazilian ecologist
 Katharina Paulus (1868–1953), German aeronaut
 Molly Shoichet, Canadian biomedical engineer
 Laura Anne Willson (1877–1942), British engineer and suffragette
 Paula T. Hammond (born 1963), American chemical engineer and material scientist

Medicine
 Phyllis Margery Anderson (1901–1957), Australian pathologist 
 Celina Turchi, Brazilian epidemiologist
 Virginia Apgar (1909–1974), American obstetrical anesthesiologist (inventor of the Apgar score)
 Heather Ashton (1929–2019), English psychopharmacologist
 Anna Baetjer (1899–1984), American physiologist and toxicologist
 Roberta Bondar (born 1945), Canadian, space medicine
 Dorothy Lavinia Brown (1919–2004), American surgeon
 Audrey Cahn (1905–2008), Australian nutritionist and microbiologist
 Margaret Chan (born 1947), Chinese-Canadian health administrator; director of the World Health Organization
 Evelyn Stocking Crosslin (1919–1991), American physician
 Eleanor Davies-Colley (1874–1934), British surgeon (first female FRCS)
 Claire Fagin (born 1926), American health-care researcher
 Sophia Getzowa (1872–1946), Belarusian-Israeli pathologist
 Esther Greisheimer (1891–1982), American academic and medical researcher
 L. Ruth Guy (1913–2006), American academic and pathologist
Janina Hurynowicz (1894–1967), Polish doctor, neurophysiologist, resistance member
 Karen C. Johnson (born 1955), American physician and clinical trials specialist who is one of Reuter's most cited scientists
 Krista Kostial-Šimonović (1923–2018), Croatian physiologist and heavy metals expert
 Mary Jeanne Kreek (1937–2021), American neurobiologist
 Elise L'Esperance (1878–1958), American pathologist
 Elaine Marjory Little (1884–1974), Australian pathologist
 Anna Suk-Fong Lok, Chinese/American hepatologist, wrote WHO and AASLD guidelines for emerging countries and liver disease
 Eleanor Josephine Macdonald (1906–2007), pioneer American cancer epidemiologist and cancer researcher
 Catharine Macfarlane (1877–1969), American obstetrician and gynecologist
 Charlotte E. Maguire (1918—2014), Florida pediatrician and medical school benefactor
 Louisa Martindale (1872–1966), British surgeon
 Helen Mayo (1878–1967), Australian doctor and pioneer in preventing infant mortality
 Frances Gertrude McGill (1882–1959), Canadian forensic pathologist
 Eleanor Montague (1926–2018), American radiologist and radiotherapist
 Anne B. Newman (born 1955), US Geriatrics & Gerontology expert
 Antonia Novello (born 1944), Puerto Rican physician and Surgeon General of the United States
 Dorothea Orem (1914–2007), Nursing theorist
 Ida Ørskov (1922–2007), Danish bacteriologist
 May Owen (1892–1988), Texas pathologist, discovered talcum powder used on surgical gloves caused infection and peritoneal scarring
 Angeliki Panajiotatou (1875–1954), Greek physician and microbiologist
 Kathleen I. Pritchard (born 1956), Canadian oncologist, breast cancer researcher and noted as one of Reuter's most cited scientists
 Frieda Robscheit-Robbins (1888–1973), German-American pathologist
 Ora Mendelsohn Rosen (1935–1990), American medical researcher
 Una Ryan (born 1941), Malaysian born-American, heart disease researcher, biotech vaccine and diagnostics maker/marketer
 Una M. Ryan (born 1966), patented DNA test identifying the protozoan parasite Cryptosporidium Velma Scantlebury (born 1955), first woman of African descent to become a transplant surgeon in the U.S.
 Lise Thiry (born 1921), Belgian virologist, senator
 Helen Rodríguez Trías (1929–2001), Puerto Rican American pediatrician and advocate for women's reproductive rights
 Stina Stenhagen (1916–1973), Swedish biochemist
 Marie Stopes (1880–-1958), British paleobotanist and pioneer in birth control
 Elizabeth M. Ward, American epidemiologist and head of the Epidemiology and Surveillance Research Department of the American Cancer Society
 Elsie Widdowson (1908–2000), British nutritionist
 Fiona Wood (born 1958), British-Australian plastic surgeon

 Meteorology 
Rely Zlatarovic (fl.'' 1920), Austrian-trained meteorologist
Nadia Zyncenko (1948–), Argentine meteorologist

Paleoanthropology
Mary Leakey (1913–1996), British paleoanthropologist
Suzanne LeClercq (1901–1994), Belgian paleobotanist and paleontologist
Betty Kellett Nadeau (1906–?), American paleontologist

Physics

 Faye Ajzenberg-Selove (1926–2012), American nuclear physicist, winner of the 2007 US National Medal of Science
Giuseppina Aliverti (1894–1982), Italian geophysicist
 Betsy Ancker-Johnson (1927–2020), American plasma physicist
 Alice Armstrong, American physicist
Marion Asche (1935–2013), German physicist and researcher of solid state physics
 Sonja Ashauer (1923–1948), first Brazilian woman to earn a doctorate in physics
 Milla Baldo-Ceolin (1924–2011), Italian particle physicist

 Marietta Blau (1894–1970), German experimental particle physicist
 Lili Bleeker (1897–1985), Dutch physicist
 Márcia Barbosa, Brazilian physicist 
 Katharine Blodgett (1898–1979), American thin-film physicist
 Christiane Bonnelle (–2016), French spectroscopist
 Tatiana Birshtein (born 1928), molecular scientist specializing in the physics of polymers
 Margrete Heiberg Bose (1866–1952), Danish physicist (active in Argentina from 1909)
 Jenny Rosenthal Bramley (1909–1997), Lithuanian-American physicist
 Harriet Brooks (1876–1933), Canadian radiation physicist
 A. Catrina Bryce (born 1956), Scottish laser scientist
 Nina Byers (1930–2014), American physicist
 Yvette Cauchois (1908–1999), French physicist
 Yvonne Choquet-Bruhat (born 1923), French theoretical physicist
 Kwang Hwa Chung (born 1948), Korean physicist
Hilda Cid Araneda (20 February 1933), Chilean biophysicist who excelled in the field of crystallography 
 Patricia Cladis (1937–2017), Canadian/American physicist

 Esther Conwell (1922–2014), American physicist, semiconductors
 Jane Dewey (1900–1979), American physicist
 Cécile DeWitt-Morette (1922–2017), French mathematician and physicist
 Louise Dolan (born 1950), American mathematical physicist, theoretical particle physics and superstring theory
 Nancy M. Dowdy (born 1938), American nuclear physicist, arms control
 Mildred Dresselhaus (1930–2017), American physicist, graphite, graphite intercalation compounds, fullerenes, carbon nanotubes, and low-dimensional thermoelectrics

 Helen T. Edwards (1936–2016), American physicist, Tevatron
 Magda Ericson (born 1929), French nuclear physicist
 Edith Farkas (1921–1993), Hungarian-born New Zealand meteorologist who measured ozone levels  
 Joan Feynman (1927–2020), American physicist
 Ursula Franklin (1921–2016), Canadian metallurgist, research physicist, author and educator
 Judy Franz (born 1938), American physicist and educator
 Joan Maie Freeman (1918–1998), Australian physicist
 Phyllis S. Freier (1921–1992), American astrophysicist
 Mary K. Gaillard (born 1939), American theoretical physicist

 Fanny Gates (1872–1931), American physicist
 Claire F. Gmachl (born 1967), American physicist
 Maria Goeppert-Mayer (1906–1972), German-American physicist, Nobel Prize in Physics 1963
 Gertrude Scharff Goldhaber (1911–1998), American nuclear physicist

 Sulamith Goldhaber (1923–1965), American high-energy physicist and molecular spectroscopist
 Gail Hanson (born 1947), American high-energy physicist

 Margrete Heiberg Bose (1866–1952), Danish/Argentine physicist
 Evans Hayward (1922–2020), American physicist
 Caroline Herzenberg (born 1932), American physicist
 Hanna von Hoerner (1942–2014), German astrophysicist
 Helen Schaeffer Huff (1883-1913), American physicist
 Shirley Jackson (born 1946), American nuclear physicist, president of Rensselaer Polytechnic Institute, first African-American woman to earn a doctorate from MIT
 Bertha Swirles Jeffreys (1903–1999), British physicist
 Lorella M. Jones (1943–1995), American particle physicist 
 Carole Jordan (born 1941), British solar physicist
 Renata Kallosh (born 1943), Russian/American theoretical physicist
 Berta Karlik (1904–1990), Austrian physicist
 Bruria Kaufman (1918–2010), American theoretical physicist
 Elizaveta Karamihailova (1897–1968), Bulgarian nuclear physicist
 Marcia Keith (1859–1950), American physicist
 Ann Kiessling (born 1942), American physicist
 Margaret G. Kivelson (born 1928), American space physicist and planetary scientist

 Noemie Benczer Koller (born 1933)
 Ninni Kronberg (1874–1946), Swedish physiologist in nutrition
 Doris Kuhlmann-Wilsdorf (1922–2010)
 Elizabeth Laird (physicist) (1874–1969)
 Juliet Lee-Franzini (1933–2014), American particle physicist

 Inge Lehmann (1888–1993), Danish seismologist and geophysicist

 Kathleen Lonsdale (1903–1971), Irish crystallographer
Barbara Kegerreis Lunde (born 1937), American physicist
 Margaret Eliza Maltby (1860–1944), American physicist
 Mileva Maric (1875–1948), Serbian physicist, first wife of Albert Einstein
 Nina Marković, Croatian physicist and professor
 Helen Megaw (1907–2002), Irish crystallographer
 Lise Meitner (1878–1968), Austrian nuclear physicist (pioneering nuclear physics, discovery of nuclear fission, protactinium, and the Auger effect)
 Kirstine Meyer (1861–1941)
 Luise Meyer-Schutzmeister (1915–1981)

 Anna Nagurney Canadian-born, US operations researcher/management scientist focusing on networks
 Chiara Nappi, Italian American physicist
 Ann Nelson (1958–2019), American physicist
 Marcia Neugebauer (born 1932), American geophysicist
 Gertrude Neumark (1927–2010)

 Ida Tacke Noddack (1896–1979)

 Emmy Noether (1882–1935), German mathematician and theoretical physicist (symmetries and conservation laws)

 Marguerite Perey (1909–1975)

 Melba Phillips (1907–2004)
 Agnes Pockels (1862–1935)
 Pelageya Polubarinova-Kochina (1899–1999), Russian physicist

 Edith Quimby (1891–1982)
 Helen Quinn (born 1943), American particle physicist
 Lisa Randall (born 1962), American physicist
 Myriam Sarachik (1933–2021), American physicist
 Bice Sechi-Zorn (1928–1984), Italian/American nuclear physicist
Anneke Levelt Sengers (born 1929), Dutch physicist specializing in the critical states of fluids
 Hertha Sponer (1895–1968), German/American physicist and chemist
 Isabelle Stone (1868–1944), American thin-film physicist and educator
 Edith Anne Stoney (1869–1938), Anglo-Irish medical physicist
 Nina Vedeneyeva (1882–1955), Russian geological physicist
 Afërdita Veveçka Priftaj (1948–2017), Albanian physicist
 Katharine Way (1903–1995), American nuclear physicist
Mariana Weissmann (born 1933), Argentine physicist, computational physics of condensed matter
 Lucy Wilson (1888–1980), American physicist, working on optics and perception
 Leona Woods (1919–1986), American nuclear physicist
 Chien-Shiung Wu (1912–1997), Chinese-American physicist (nuclear physics, [non-]conservation of parity)
 Sau Lan Wu, Chinese-American particle physicist
 Xide Xie (Hsi-teh Hsieh) (1921–2000), Chinese physicist

 Rosalyn Sussman Yalow (1921–2011), American medical physicist (Nobel prize in Physiology or Medicine 1977 for radioimmunoassay)
Fumiko Yonezawa (1938–2019), Japanese theoretical physicist
 Toshiko Yuasa (1909–1980), Japanese nuclear physicist

Psychology
 Mary Ainsworth (1913–1999), American-Canadian developmental psychologist, inventor of the "Strange Situation" procedure
 Martha E. Bernal (1931–2001), Mexican-American clinical psychologist, first Latina to receive a psychology PhD in the United States
 Nise da Silveira (1905–1999), Brazilian psychiatrist and mental health reformer
 Lera Boroditsky, American psychologist
 Ludmilla A.Chistovich (1924–2006), Russian speech scientist
 Mamie Clark (1917–1983), African-American psychologist active in the civil rights movement
 Helen Flanders Dunbar (1902–1959), important early figure in U.S. psychosomatic medicine
Tsuruko Haraguchi (1886–1915), Japanese psychologist
 Margaret Kennard (1899–1975), pioneering researcher on age effects on brain damage, which produced early evidence for neuroplasticity
 Varia Kipiani (1879-1950/1965), pioneering Georgian (country) psychophysiologist who studied fatigue and child development
Grace Manson (1893–1967), occupational psychologist
 Rosalie Rayner (1898–1935), American psychology researcher
 Marianne Simmel (1923–2010), American psychologist, made important contributions in research on social perception and phantom limb
 Davida Teller (1938–2011), American psychologist, known for work on development of the visual system in infants
Nora Volkow (born 1956), Mexican-American psychiatrist, director of the National Institute on Drug Abuse (NIDA)
 Margo Wilson (1945–2009), Canadian evolutionary psychologist
 Catherine G. Wolf (1947–2018), American psychologist and expert in human-computer interaction

See also

Index of women scientists articles
List of female mathematicians
List of female Nobel laureates
Women in computing
Women in engineering
Women in geology
Women in medicine

Notes

References

External links
Contributions of 20th Century Women to Physics

.
20
Scientists,Female